You're the Song I've Always Wanted to Sing is the second studio album by American R&B singer Timmy Thomas, released in 1974 by Glades and TK Records. The album was re-released on CD in 2004 by EMI.

Joining Timmy Thomas on this outing were other Henry Stone musicians and vocalists who recorded on the labels Glades, TK and Polydor. They were Betty Wright, George "Chocolate" Perry, Jerome Smith, and Willie "Little Beaver" Hale.

Track listing

Personnel
 Timmy Thomas – lead vocals, keyboards
 Willie "Little Beaver" Hale – guitar
 Jerome Smith – guitar
 George "Chocolate" Perry – bass guitar
 Ron Bogdon – bass guitar
 Robert Ferguson – drums
 Robert Johnson – drums
 Betty Wright – backing vocals
 Margaret Reynolds – backing vocals

References

External links
 

1974 albums
Timmy Thomas albums
TK Records albums